The Droitwich transmitting station is a large broadcasting facility for long-wave and medium-wave transmissions, established in 1934 in the civil parish of Dodderhill, just outside the village of Wychbold, near Droitwich in Worcestershire, England. The site is the location of the British Broadcasting Corporation's most powerful long-wave transmitter, which together with the two Scottish long-wave transmitters at Burghead and Westerglen forms a network broadcasting on the same frequency. The masts can be seen to the east from the M5 motorway, between Droitwich and Bromsgrove, as well as to the west from the Herefordshire/Worcestershire border. At night, the two sets of aircraft warning lights are visible from a long distance. Due to the bright red lights illuminated at night, some locals have renamed the site "the devil horns of Wychbold". The station is owned and operated by Arqiva.

Technical specifications
The long-wave frequency used was 200 kilohertz (frequently referred to by the wavelength, 1,500 metres) until 1 February 1988 when it was changed to 198 kilohertz, and the power is currently 500 kilowatts. The carrier frequency is controlled by a rubidium atomic frequency standard in the transmitter building, enabling the transmission to be used as an off-air frequency standard. There are also two guyed mast radiators at the site. The northerly mast is actually the transmitting antenna whilst the southern mast is a passive reflector causing the rf signal to form a cardioid pattern tending in a NE direction so as not to interfere with the similar set up in Bristol. The smaller mast system transmits digital radio signals. The main large system is used for transmitting AM medium-wave radio programmes on 693 kilohertz, 1053 kilohertz and 1215 kilohertz.

Transmissions
BBC Radio 4 Longwave is transmitted on 198 kHz. This signal also carries radio data encoded using phase modulation, giving a time-of-day signal, and radio teleswitch control signals for Economy 7 electric-heating systems.

BBC Radio 5 Live is broadcast on 693 kHz medium wave (MW), providing coverage for most of the English Midlands and Wales at a signal strength (150 kW) which is one of the strongest for that station, equal to Brookmans Park and second only to Moorside Edge.

During World War II coded messages, read during normal programme broadcasts, were sent to the French Resistance using the transmitter.

In 2011 as part of the BBC cuts it was announced that there would be no re-investment in long wave which may mean an eventual end to BBC Radio 4 in this part of the radio spectrum. The Guardian published a story in October 2011 saying that the transmitter relies upon a pair of glass valves, of which there are fewer than 10 left in the world, and the BBC did not believe it was safe enough to manufacture more, because "slightly faulty" replacements could cause catastrophic failure.

Reception
The Radio 4 LW signal from Droitwich covers most of England and Wales. There are supplementary long-wave transmitters in Scotland (Burghead and Westerglen, both 50 kW), with medium-wave transmitters in various parts of England, Scotland and Northern Ireland. The station can also be heard clearly in most of the Republic of Ireland, particularly along eastern and southern counties. Reception is also possible in Western Europe, including Italy and Sweden.

Services available

Formerly:

See also
 List of masts
 List of radio stations in the United Kingdom
 List of tallest buildings and structures in Great Britain
 Radio teleswitch

References

External links
 The Transmission Gallery: Droitwich Transmitter photographs and information
 Radio Teleswitch Services
 Radio Rewind Droitwich Page
 Specification of BBC phase-modulated transmissions on long-wave
 Station History
 Droitwich The World's Most Modern Long Wave Transmitter

Radio in the United Kingdom
Buildings and structures in Worcestershire
Droitwich Spa
Transmitter sites in England